D. P. Walter was a Republican state senator. On November 5, 1872, he was elected member of the Nevada Senate and represented Nye County. Walter's term started the next day. He attended two regular sessions and his term ended in 1876. Walter was succeeded by Harry T. Creswell.

References 

Republican Party Nevada state senators
People from Nye County, Nevada